Miguel Luis Lopez Tabuena (born 13 October 1994) is a Filipino professional golfer. He plays on the Asian Tour where he has won three times.

Amateur career
As an amateur golfer, Tabuena won the events in Malaysia and Singapore and won the silver medal at the 2010 Asian Games in the men's individual event. He turned professional in 2011.

Professional career
Tabuena has played on the Asian Tour since 2011. He picked up his first win at the 2015 Philippine Open. In 2016 he was joint runner-up in the Maybank Championship Malaysia, an event co-sanctioned with the European Tour. His second Asian Tour win came at the 2018 Queen's Cup hosted by Jaidee Foundation. Tabuena also plays on the Philippine Golf Tour, where he has 15 wins.

Awards
In 2016, Tabuena was recognized as the Sportsman of the Year of the Philippine Sportswriters Association, sharing the award with Filipino boxing champions Donnie Nietes and Nonito Donaire.

Amateur wins
2010 Malaysian Junior Open, SICC JIGC

Source:

Professional wins (18)

Asian Tour wins (3)

*Note: The 2015 Philippine Open was shortened to 54 holes due to rain.

Asian Tour playoff record (0–1)

OneAsia Tour wins (1)

1Co-sanctioned by the PGT Asia

OneAsia Tour playoff record (1–0)

Philippine Golf Tour wins (13)

PGT Asia wins (2)

1Co-sanctioned by the OneAsia Tour

Results in major championships

CUT = missed the halfway cut
Note: Tabuena only played in the U.S. Open.

Results in World Golf Championships

"T" = Tied

Team appearances
Professional
World Cup (representing the Philippines): 2016

References

External links

Filipino male golfers
Asian Tour golfers
Olympic golfers of the Philippines
Golfers at the 2016 Summer Olympics
Asian Games medalists in golf
Asian Games silver medalists for the Philippines
Golfers at the 2010 Asian Games
Medalists at the 2010 Asian Games
Sportspeople from Manila
1994 births
Living people